The Vientiane Times is a bilingual English and Lao newspaper, published daily in Vientiane, Laos. Established in 1994 as a weekly, the paper was started by an agency, Lao Press in Foreign Languages, under the Ministry of Information and Culture. It went to twice per week in 1996 and daily in 2004. It runs to 16 pages.

See also
List of newspapers in Laos

References

English-language newspapers published in Asia
Newspapers published in Laos
Vientiane
Weekly newspapers
1994 establishments in Laos
Publications established in 1994